Leyton Rivera (born 28 October 2001) is a Swedish-born Norwegian tennis player.

Rivera has a career high ATP doubles ranking of 1413 achieved on 1 November 2021.

Rivera made his ATP main draw debut at the 2022 ATP Cup as one of the five members of the Norwegian team.

References

External links

2001 births
Living people
Norwegian male tennis players
21st-century Norwegian people